Janne Reinikainen may refer to:

 Janne Reinikainen (actor)
 Janne Reinikainen (footballer)